Mura may refer to:

Places
 Mura (Drava), a tributary of the Drava in Austria, Hungary, Slovenia and Croatia
 Mura (Angara), a tributary of the Angara in Russia
 Mura, Lombardy, a comune in the Province of Brescia, Italy
 Mura, Barcelona, a municipality in the Province of Barcelona, Catalonia, Spain
 Mura Statistical Region, in Slovenia

People
 Mura (surname)
 Saint Mura (c. 550–645), first abbot of the monastery at Fahan, County Donegal, Ireland
 Mura, mother of Chandragupta Maurya, the founder of the Maurya Empire in ancient India
 Munda people of Tripura, India
 Mura people, an indigenous people in Brazil
 Mura (actor), Filipino actor and comedian

Slovenian football clubs
 NK Mura, a defunct Slovenian football club
 ND Mura 05, a defunct Slovenian football club
 NŠ Mura, a Slovenian football club

Other uses
 MurA or UDP-N-acetylglucosamine enolpyruvyl transferase, an enzyme
 Mura, administrative units of modern villages of Japan and Edo-period villages
 Mura, an extinct member of the family of Muran languages
 Mura (Japanese term), meaning unevenness or inconsistency in physical matter or human spiritual condition
 MURA, the Midwestern Universities Research Association, from 1953 to 1967
 MURA or Modified Uniformly Redundant Array, a type of mask used in coded aperture imaging
 Mura (cicada), a genus of cicadas

See also
Miura (disambiguation)
Mur (disambiguation)
Muras (disambiguation)